The Upper Salmon River divides Fundy National Park and the village of Alma, New Brunswick at its delta. Here, it is inundated with tidal water from the Salisbury Bay (Chignecto Bay) a kilometer to the site of a former dam, making for a large estuary and inter-tidal zone. Its watershed catchment drains a large area in and outside the park, made up of tributaries and their sub-units including Kinnie Brook, Laverty, Forty-five River, Lake Brook, Greenough Brook, and others.

It is a sub-unit within the Chignecto Bay North Watershed, an area designated under the UNESCO Programme on Man and the Biosphere. Macro-regionally, it is part of the Gulf of Maine watershed.

History 
Its name hints at the clarification needed to distinguish the "salmon rivers". More than one Salmon River existed in Saint John County and elsewhere in the bay. Some are only a few miles apart. Early land claims on the river were delayed by confusion over the exact river, and it wasn't until the matter was settled in a court of law.

But it is also now referred to as the Alma River. In the settlement's heyday, the river and the village were both named for the Salmon River. It was severed from Saint John, and in 1856 the area was established within Albert County, by Legislative authority, as Alma Parish, after the Crimean War battle.

Ecosystems 
The inter-tidal areas are teeming with life, as it is said these are some of the most productive ecosystems in the world. Currently, researchers are tagging and tracking Atlantic Salmon and American Eels in order to better understand the anadromous fish and their habitats.

Tall Acadian forest flanks the river and its tributaries in the very steep and rocky river valleys.

See also
List of rivers of New Brunswick

External links 
 Fundy Biosphere Reserve

Rivers of New Brunswick
Landforms of Albert County, New Brunswick